FUGE Camps is a series of Christian summer camps for children, youth, and young adults centered on Bible study, worship, mission work, and recreational activities organized by LifeWay Christian Resources of the Southern Baptist Convention. FUGE Camps is the world's largest summer camp, as well as the world's largest Christian camp. FUGE Camps offers four different styles of camp, where churches can choose to attend either Centrifuge (CFUGE or CF) or Mission Fuge (MFUGE or MF). At "combo" locations, churches can choose to do a mixture of these, if they desire, to meet their student's needs. A Student Leader Apprentice program is also offered for students entering or leaving their senior year of high school. College students and adults may apply to work as a staffer when they turn 19 years of age, and have been out of high school for at least one year.

Background
Since 1979 FUGE has been the official youth camp of the Southern Baptist Convention.  What started out as a few weeks of camp sponsored by the Baptist Sunday School Board (now LifeWay Christian Resources) turned into a youth ministry movement.

FUGE camps are unique in that there is not a central camp facility where the program is conducted.  Instead, teams of staffers are based at various colleges and retreat centers across the United States.  Student-campers are usually housed in college dormitories or convention-style hotel rooms.

Because of this decentralized approach, FUGE staffs—usually about 20-30 college students and recent college graduates—are able to reach students across the United States.

LifeWay Christian Resources states that since the beginning of the ministry, over 1,000,000 people have experienced Centrifuge and its associated camps. Each summer, FUGE Camps hosts almost 60,000 students.

Programming
FUGE Camps are open to students who have just completed grades 6–12. College students and adults can attend camp as Adult Sponsors. They are centered on the youth groups of Christian churches, particularly (though not exclusively) Baptist churches.  The camps offer a "staffer who does the work so that your youth staff are free to deepen their relationships with both students and God."

The FUGE experience includes:
 Strong small-group youth Bible study, led by a trained camp staffer (CF, MF)
 Team-building activity (CF)
 Missions Activities in the local community (MF)
 Morning and evening worship services (CF, MF)
 Various Night Life experiences, including Mega Relay (CF, MF)

Typical schedule
Though FUGE Camps vary slightly at each location due to differences in personnel and available facilities, a typical day at FUGE would include:

CFUGE Camp Schedule

MFUGE Camp Schedule

Locations
Summer 2018, there were FUGE Camps located at:

Themes

FUGE Staff Structure 
FUGE Camp staffs typically consist of 20-30 staffers, but can be as small as 12 staffers or as large as 60. Each location has a Camp Director, assistant director, Financial Director, and Program Director. Locations that offer Centrifuge will have a Recreation Director and Bible Study Leaders. Locations that offer MFuge will have a Site Director and ministry Track Leaders. Each location has a Video Producer, who makes daily and weekly videos. Larger locations will hire FUGE Support Staffers who help with set up, tear down, and other office tasks. Some locations have full-summer bands, which are referred to as "Staff Bands." These band members will also be Bible Study Leaders or Ministry Track Leaders. At other locations, they hire "Contract Bands" that change each week. These bands only play during morning celebration and worship. Camps have a different Pastor each week.

There are also other positions that are required on each staff, but are usually taken on by Ministry Track Leaders or Bible Study Leaders. These positions include Photographer, Backpacker, Missions Mobilizer, and Emcee.

Mission FUGE
Mission FUGE (MFuge) originally started in 1995 and was the second Centrifuge spin-off. MFuge takes the traditional Centrifuge structure and reorients it toward mission work.  Instead of offering track times and recreation during the day like Centrifuge does, those activities are replaced with missions work such as working in soup kitchens, volunteering at community centers, or cutting grass in neighborhood communities. Students also have the opportunity to minister by facilitating games and other recreation at local apartment complexes or Boys and Girls Clubs; visiting assisted-living facilities and nursing homes; and doing yard work for the elderly and other needy people.

MFuge track availability varies by location, but include: 
 Games and Recreation
 Children's
 Social
 Painting, Construction, and Yardwork (PCY) 
 Homeless
 Special Needs
 Evangelism
 Beach Evangelism
 International
 Peer

Crosspoint sports camp
Crosspoint originally started in 1986. It was the first Centrifuge spin off. Crosspoint is designed to combine the structure of Centrifuge with the sports-skills teaching of the traditional sports daycamp. The programming and sports instruction is designed for students in grades 4–8. 2009 was the last year LifeWay ran a kids' camp by the name "Crosspoint." All the sports once included in Crosspoint have now been implemented in LifeWay's CentriKid camp.

XFUGE and XFUGE on Mission (2005-2018)
XFUGE and XFUGE on Mission took the general template of a normal FUGE Camp and removed many of the traditional "summer camp" aspects, like assemblies and structured track times and reoriented the experience toward a Christian retreat: spiritual formation was conducted through worship experiences and optional missions work, but leisure activities, such as swimming or sunbathing on the beach, were more prominent. XFUGE and XFUGE on mission allowed church youth groups to "design" a camp based on their own personal needs.

The XFUGE variants to the FUGE experience were first offered in the Summer of 2005 with great success. XFUGE was offered every year thereafter, coming to and end in 2018 (the last year they offered XFUGE).

Notes

External links
Official website

Christian summer camps
Southern Baptist Convention
Baptist organizations established in the 20th century